In geometry, the enneagonal prism (or nonagonal prism) is the seventh in an infinite set of prisms, formed by square sides and two regular enneagon caps.

If faces are all regular, it is a semiregular polyhedron.

Related polyhedra 

Prismatoid polyhedra